The Blériot 73 was a large First World War French heavy night bomber designed and built by Blériot to the BN3 specification. Only a single prototype was built, which crashed on landing from its first flight, killing the pilot. The Blériot 74, Blériot 75 and Blériot 76, respectively, a heavy bomber / airliner, airliner and heavy bomber, directly evolved mfrom the Blériot 71 / Blériot 73 bombers.

Design and development

Blériot 73
The Blériot 73 was a large equal-span biplane with a fuselage suspended from the lower wing and bearing a resemblance to, and slightly larger than, the Blériot 71, with the exception of the flying-boat like fuselage, attached beneath the lower mainplane, sweeping elegantly upwards to the biplane tail unit with twin rudders.. Four  Hispano-Suiza 8Fb water-cooled V-8 engines were mounted as close to the centreline as possible, two on the upper wing leading edge and two on the lower wing. The fixed landing gear had two twin wheel-wheel units, with large track, on struts and no tailskid. During flight testing the Bl 73 disintegrated on 22 January 1919, killing the pilot: One prototype built.

Blériot 74
After the poor performance and crash of the Blériot 73, Touillet developed a heavy bomber/airliner with a large double bubble fuselage on top of the lower wing. The wings were similar to those of the Blériot 73, similarly with four  Hispano-Suiza 8Fb engines grouped around the fuselage. Flight testing at Villacoubly was abruptly terminated on 22 January 1920 when oscillations in the tail unit caused a structural failure and the fatal crash of the sole Blériot 74. Only one prototype was built.

Blériot 75 Aerobus
The airliner version of the Blériot 74 had a new wing with dihedral on both upper and lower mainplanes, a longer rear fuselage and enlarged vertical tail surface. Despite promising flight-test results of the sole Blériot 75, the design did not attract any orders. One prototype was built.

Blériot 76
Designed for the wartime BN4 specification the Blériot 76 bomber followed the same configuration as the previous members of the Blériot 73 family, but had the lower  Hispano-Suiza 8Fb engines further outboard than the upper  Hispano-Suiza 8Fb engines, slightly swept-back wings and a pair of very large mainwheels: Design only, not built.

Specifications (Blériot 73)

References

Notes

1910s French bomber aircraft
73
Four-engined tractor aircraft
Aircraft first flown in 1918
Four-engined piston aircraft